GTCR LLC is a Chicago, Illinois-based private equity firm focused on leveraged buyout, leveraged recapitalization, growth capital and rollup transactions.  The firm principally invests in high-growth industries, including financial services & technology, healthcare, information services & technology, and growth business services.

Since 1980, GTCR has reportedly invested more than $15 billion in over 200 companies. As of 2021, the firm has more than 80 employees, including over 40 investment professionals.

History

The company was founded in 1980 as Golder Thoma & Co. by Stanley Golder, Carl Thoma, and Bryan Cressey. In the 1970s, Golder built the private equity program at First Chicago Corp. where he is noted primarily for backing Federal Express and for efforts as chairman of the National Venture Capital Association and the National Association of Small Business Investment Companies to change federal laws allowing pensions to invest in private equity.  Golder Thoma & Cressey received much of its initial funding from William M. Blair and upon leaving First Chicago, Golder was replaced by John A. Canning, Jr. who would go on to found rival Chicago private equity firm Madison Dearborn.

The firm became Golder Thoma & Cressey in 1984, and with the promotion of Bruce Rauner to partner the firm would come to be known as Golder, Thoma, Cressey, Rauner, Inc. (GTCR), although it would still often be referred to as Golder Thoma.

In 1998, disagreements between the senior partners led Golder, Thoma, Cressey, Rauner, Inc. split into two private equity firms.  Both firms continue to invest primarily through consolidations of specific industries, referred to as roll-ups:

GTCR Golder Rauner, (Stanley Golder and Bruce Rauner), the private equity firm, based in Chicago, now known as GTCR.  GTCR founder Stanley Golder died in 2000 and lead partner Bruce Rauner retired in 2012.  Today the firm is led by several senior partners, including Collin Roche, Dean Mihas, Craig Bondy and David Donnini.
 Thoma Cressey, (Carl Thoma and Bryan Cressey) based in Chicago and San Francisco.  Thoma Cressey would be renamed Thoma Cressey Bravo to reflect the growing role of partner Orlando Bravo.  In 2008, Bryan Cressey left Thoma Cressey Bravo with several investment professionals to form Cressey & Co. a healthcare-focused private equity firm. Thoma Cressey Bravo became Thoma Bravo after Cressey’s departure, led by managing partners Carl Thoma, Orlando Bravo, Lee Mitchell and Scott Crabill. The firm closed its 9th fund in March 2009 with $822.5 million.

Investment funds
GTCR invests through a series of private limited partnerships and its investors include a variety of pension funds (e.g., Washington State Investment Board, Pennsylvania State Employee's Retirement System) endowments and other institutional investors.

Following its separation from Thoma Cressey (discussed above), GTCR has raised seven private equity funds totaling $20 billion in limited partner commitments:
 1998 - Fund VI, ($870 million)
 2000 - Fund VII ($2.0 billion)
 2003 - Fund VIII ($1.8 billion)
 2006 - Fund IX ($2.75 billion)
 2011 - Fund X ($3.25 billion)
 2014 - Fund XI ($3.85 billion)
2017 - Fund XII ($5.25 billion)
2020 - Fund XIII ($7.5 billion)

External links
GTCR (official website)

References

Financial services companies established in 1980
Private equity firms of the United States
Companies based in Chicago
American companies established in 1980